Barrie—Springwater—Oro-Medonte is a federal electoral district in Ontario. It encompasses a portion of Ontario previously included in the electoral districts of Barrie, Simcoe—Grey and Simcoe North.

History

Barrie—Springwater—Oro-Medonte was created by the 2012 federal electoral boundaries redistribution and was legally defined in the 2013 representation order. It came into effect upon the call of the 42nd Canadian federal election, scheduled for 19 October 2015.

Members of Parliament

This riding has elected the following Members of Parliament:

Recount

On Monday October 26, 2015, a judge granted the Liberal Party's request for a judicial recount after a 'significant number of rejected and spoiled ballots' were argued may not have been handled properly.

Demographics
According to the Canada 2011 Census; 2013 representation

Ethnic groups: 92.1% White, 2.9% Aboriginal 
Languages: 90.7% English, 2.5% French, 1.1% German
Religions: 67.4% Christian (24.1% Catholic, 12.2% United Church, 9.9% Anglican, 5.1% Presbyterian, 2.9% Baptist, 1.3% Pentecostal, 12.0% Other), 30.5% No religion 
Median income (2010): $29,562 
Average income (2010): $40,565

Riding associations

Riding associations are the local branches of the national political parties:

Election results

References

Ontario federal electoral districts
Politics of Barrie
2013 establishments in Ontario